
This is a complete list of ice hockey players who have played for the Boston Bruins in the National Hockey League (NHL). It includes players that have played at least one game, either in the NHL regular season or in the NHL playoffs.

Key
  Appeared in a Bruins game during the 2021–2022 season.
  Stanley Cup Champion or Hockey Hall of Famer.

The "Seasons" column lists the first year of the season of the player's first game and the last year of the season of the player's last game. For example, a player who played one game in the 2000–2001 season would be listed as playing with the team from 2000–2001, regardless of what calendar year the game occurred within.

Statistics complete as of the 2021–2022 NHL season.

Goaltenders

Skaters

See also 

 List of NHL players

References 

 
 
 

 
Boston Bruins
players